Edward John Doody (15 December 1903 − 9 April 1968) was an Australian Roman Catholic bishop.

Born in Brisbane, Doody was ordained to the priesthood in Rome on 12 March 1927, and was later parish priest of Nambour. Doody was named bishop of the Roman Catholic Diocese of Armidale, Australia in 1948 and died in 1968 while still in office.

He worked to improve conditions for local Aborigines. From 1958 he received debutantes at an annual Aboriginal Ball.

In the 1950s, he was a strong supporter of B. A. Santamaria's fight against Communism.

He attended the Second Vatican Council from 1962 to 1965 and contributed to discussions on clerical celibacy and tradition.

References 

1903 births
1968 deaths
People from Brisbane
Roman Catholic bishops of Armidale
20th-century Roman Catholic bishops in Australia